Peace of Mind is the third studio album by Finnish glam rock singer Michael Monroe released in 1996. The album was re-issued and made available worldwide on a widespread release only on March 14, 2000.

The album was produced by Michael Monroe himself, though the two demo bonus tracks were produced, arranged and mixed by the late Stiv Bators of the Dead Boys, who also contributed vocals to both tracks, and were recorded in 1985, prior to his death in 1990.

Track listing

Personnel
Michael Monroe - lead vocals, lead & rhythm guitars, acoustic guitar, bass, harmonica, flute, saxophone
Jimmy Clark - drums, shakers, backing vocals
Ölli Hildén - rhythm guitar (on tracks 2-3, 6-7, 9), backing vocals
T.T. Oksala - acoustic guitar on track 4; engineer
Jude Wilder - backing vocals
Stiv Bators - additional vocals on "I Wanna Be With You" and "It's a Lie"

Michael Monroe albums
1996 albums